Richmond Line refers to the following transit lines:
Richmond Line (Staten Island), a former streetcar line in New York, United States
Richmond railway line in Sydney, Australia